Mary & Myself is a Canadian documentary film, directed by Sam Decoste and released in 2013. Through animation and archival photographs, the film depicts the real-life story of Jia Tsu Ye-Thompson and Mary Mohammed, two elderly women rehearsing for their stage debut playing the comfort women in a production of The Vagina Monologues.

The film received a Canadian Screen Award nomination for Best Short Documentary Film at the 2nd Canadian Screen Awards in 2014.

References

External links
 
 Watch Mary & Myself at the National Film Board of Canada

2013 films
2013 short documentary films
2010s animated short films
Canadian short documentary films
Canadian animated short films
Canadian animated documentary films
National Film Board of Canada animated short films
National Film Board of Canada documentaries
2010s English-language films
2010s Canadian films